Hasnizaidi bin Jamian (born 27 March 1990) is a Malaysian footballer who plays as a right back for Terengganu.

Career statistics

Club

References

External links
 

1990 births
Terengganu FC players
Felda United F.C. players
Johor Darul Ta'zim F.C. players
Living people
Malaysian footballers
Malaysia international footballers
Malaysia Super League players
Association football defenders